Lestes amicus is a species of damselfly in the family Lestidae, the spreadwings. It is native to much of southern and central Africa. It lives near streams and pools, often in swampy habitat.

References

A
Odonata of Africa
Fauna of Central Africa
Least concern biota of Africa
Insects described in 1910
Taxonomy articles created by Polbot